Amore is the debut studio album by American rock band the Hooters, released in 1983.

Background
The Hooters got their start with their independently released album Amore.  It cost $12,000 to record. The album sold over 100,000 copies, mostly in the Philadelphia area, and led to their major label record deal with Columbia Records in 1984.

Amore introduced the original versions of four songs: "All You Zombies," "Hanging on a Heartbeat," "Fightin' on the Same Side," and "Blood from a Stone," which would reappear in different versions on later albums.

An early studio recording of "Fightin' on the Same Side" and a live recording of "All You Zombies" had previously been released as singles in 1981 and 1982, respectively, on the small indie label Eighty Percent Records.  

In 2001, 18 years after its original release on LP album and cassette, Amore was made available on compact disc and included two cover versions as bonus tracks: the Beatles' "Lucy in the Sky with Diamonds" from June 15, 1986, at A Conspiracy of Hope, a benefit concert on behalf of Amnesty International at Giants Stadium in East Rutherford, New Jersey, and the Skatalites' "Man in the Street," a live demo from the first Hooters recording session in 1980, which was also the band's first song to be played on the radio.

Critical reception
Trouser Press wrote: "The Hooters’ easy facility in many stylistic genres (reggae, the main impulse on Amore, remains in the repertoire, along with glossed-up heartland rock versed in folk traditionalism) matches an inability to pin down any clear-cut personality."

Track listing
All tracks are written by Rob Hyman and Eric Bazilian, except where noted.

 "Amore" - 3:31
 "Blood from a Stone" - 3:19
 "Hanging on a Heartbeat" (Hyman, Bazilian, Glenn Goss, Jeff Ziv) - 3:01
 "All You Zombies" - 3:47
 "Birdman" - 3:17
 "Don't Wanna Fight" - 2:50
 "Fightin' on the Same Side" - 2:53
 "Concubine" - 2:22

2001 CD bonus tracks
<li>"Lucy in the Sky with Diamonds" (live, 1986) (John Lennon, Paul McCartney) - 3:59
<li>"Man in the Street" (demo, 1980) (Don Drummond) - 3:58

Personnel
Credits adapted from the album liner notes.

The Hooters
Eric Bazilian – lead vocals (1, 2, 3, 6), guitar, saxophone
John Lilley – guitar
Rob Hyman – lead vocals (2, 4, 5, 7, 8), keyboards
Rob Miller – bass, vocals
David Uosikkinen – drums
Technical
Eric Bazilian – producer 
Rob Hyman – producer
Phil Nicolo – engineer 
Bob Ludwig – mastering
Barbara Blair – art direction, design  
Mark Chin – photography  
Stephen Spera – cover art
Charles Grumbling – graphics 
Tomas Sokol – label design, inner sleeve

References

The Hooters albums
1983 debut albums
Albums produced by Eric Bazilian
Albums produced by Rob Hyman